Echeveria xichuensis is a succulent species of flowering plant in the family Crassulaceae, endemic to Xichú, Guanajuato, Mexico.

Description 
Echeveria xichuensis has a short stem, with thick, pointy, elliptical to egg-shaped leaves. The leaves color are dark olive-green to tinged purple. The rosettes grow into  diameter. The flowers usually are salmon pink color on the outside, orange inside and usually bloom in spring.

References 

Plants described in 1998
xichuensis
Flora of Mexico